Ramachari – Eedo Pedda Goodachari is a 2013 Indian Telugu-language comedy film directed by Eshwar. A remake of C.I.D. Moosa, the film stars Venu Thottempudi and Kamalinee Mukherjee. The film was released on 17 May 2013. After the failure of this film, Venu Thottempudi took a break from acting.

Cast 
Venu Thottempudi as Ramachari
Kamalinee Mukherjee as Geetha 
Ali as Ganguly 
Brahmanandam as Chinta
Chandramohan as Kotachari 
L. B. Sriram as Tatachari 
M. Balayya as Harischandra Prasad
Murali Sharma as Chadda
Suthi Velu as Ganapathi

Production 
This is the second collaboration between Venu Thottempudi and Kamalinee Mukherjee after Gopi Gopika Godavari (2009). A song was shot at Ramoji Film City. The film was ready for release in 2011.

Reception 
A critic from The Times of India wrote that "In the garb of comedy, you will realise there is so much of silly stuff, that towards the end you won’t mind it – so long as the packaged comedy is funny enough to provoke laughter". A critic from 123telugu wrote that "Except for one or two very humorous moments, ‘Ramachari’ ends up being quite a disappointment. Issues with the script and bad screenplay spoil the viewing experience". A critic from Full Hyderabad wrote that "The film's production values are extremely low. Its titles credit the music of the film to Manisarma, but the tunes sound more like they've been scored by a distant cousin of Manisarma's driver". A critic from India Herald called the film an "Outdated comedy film of summer".

References 

Telugu remakes of Malayalam films